Isaac Broc Rockenfield (November 3, 1876 – February 21, 1927) was a second baseman in Major League Baseball. He played for the St. Louis Browns.

References

External links

1876 births
1927 deaths
Major League Baseball second basemen
St. Louis Browns players
Baseball players from Nebraska
Sportspeople from Omaha, Nebraska
Seattle Clamdiggers players
Tacoma Tigers players
Oakland Oaks (baseball) players
Seattle Chinooks players
Olympia Senators players
Portland Browns players
Spokane Indians players
St. Paul Saints (AA) players
Seattle Siwashes players
Little Rock Travelers players
Jersey City Skeeters players
Montgomery Senators players
Montgomery Climbers players
Kansas City Blues (baseball) players
Quincy Old Soldiers players